German submarine U-613 was a Type VIIC U-boat built for Nazi Germany's Kriegsmarine for service during World War II.
She was laid down on 6 May 1941 by Blohm & Voss, Hamburg as yard number 589, launched on 29 January 1942 and commissioned on 12 March 1942 under Kapitänleutnant Helmut Köppe.

Design
German Type VIIC submarines were preceded by the shorter Type VIIB submarines. U-613 had a displacement of  when at the surface and  while submerged. She had two shafts and two  propellers.

U-613 was fitted with five  torpedo tubes (four fitted at the bow and one at the stern), fourteen torpedoes, one  SK C/35 naval gun, 220 rounds, and a  C/30 anti-aircraft gun. The boat had a complement of between forty-four and sixty.

Service history
The boat's career began with training at 8th U-boat Flotilla on 12 March 1942, followed by active service on 1 November 1942 as part of the 3rd U-boat Flotilla for the remainder of her service.

Wolfpacks
U-613 took part in six wolfpacks, namely:
 Natter (2 – 8 November 1942)
 Westwall (8 – 18 November 1942)
 Habicht (10 – 19 January 1943)
 Haudegen (19 January – 9 February 1943)
 Adler (7 – 13 April 1943)
 Meise (13 – 25 April 1943)

Fate
All hands were lost.

Summary of raiding history

References

Bibliography

External links

German Type VIIC submarines
1942 ships
U-boats commissioned in 1942
Ships lost with all hands
U-boats sunk in 1943
U-boats sunk by depth charges
U-boats sunk by US warships
World War II shipwrecks in the Atlantic Ocean
World War II submarines of Germany
Ships built in Hamburg
Maritime incidents in July 1943